The Bulletin was an Australian weekly magazine first published in Sydney on 31 January 1880. The publication's focus was politics and business, with some literary content, and editions were often accompanied by cartoons and other illustrations. The views promoted by the magazine varied across different editors and owners, with the publication consequently considered either on the left or right of the political spectrum at various stages in its history. The Bulletin was highly influential in Australian culture and politics until after the First World War, and was then noted for its nationalist, pro-labour, and pro-republican writing.

It was revived as a modern news magazine in the 1960s, and after merging with the Australian edition of Newsweek in 1984 was retitled The Bulletin with Newsweek. It was Australia's longest running magazine publication until the final issue was published in January 2008.

Early history

The Bulletin was founded by J. F. Archibald and John Haynes, with the first issue being published in 1880. The original content of The Bulletin consisted of a mix of political comment, sensationalised news, and Australian literature. For a short period in 1880, their first artist William Macleod was also a partner.

In the early years, The Bulletin played a significant role in the encouragement and circulation of nationalist sentiments that remained influential far into the next century. Its writers and cartoonists regularly attacked the British, Chinese, Japanese, Indians, Jews, and Aboriginal Australians. In 1907 or 1908, editor James Edmond changed The Bulletins nationalist banner from "Australia for Australians" to "Australia for the White Man". An editorial laid out its reasons for choosing such banners:

Its role in the Australian literary surge of the "Nineties" is far more ambiguous: as Sylvia Lawson, the biographer of Archibald, observed, "the heroes of the stockwhip and the wattle blossom ... scarcely existed in the Bulletin".

Contributors
As The Bulletin evolved, it became known as a platform for young and aspiring writers to showcase their short stories and poems to large audiences. By 1890, it was the focal point of an emerging literary nationalism known as the "Bulletin School", and a number of its contributors, often called bush poets, have become giants of Australian literature. Notable writers associated with The Bulletin at this time include:

 Francis Adams
 William Astley
 Barbara Baynton
 George Lewis Becke
 Randolph Bedford
 E.J. Brady
 Christopher Brennan
 Victor Daley
 Frank Dalby Davison
 C. J. Dennis
 Albert Dorrington
 Edward Dyson
 Ernest Favenc
 Joseph Furphy
 Mary Gilmore
 C. A. Jeffries ("Jeff")
 Henry Lawson

 Pattie Lewis ("Mab")
 Dorothy Mackellar
 Harry 'The Breaker' Morant 
 John Shaw Neilson
 Will H. Ogilvie
 Nettie Palmer
 Vance Palmer
 Andrew Barton 'Banjo' Paterson
 Katherine Susannah Prichard
 Steele Rudd
 Alfred Stephens
 Douglas Stewart
 Louise Mack
 Ethel Turner
 Alexina Maude Wildman
 David McKee Wright

A number of notable artists provided illustrations and cartoons for the publication. These include,

 Edward Ambrose Dyson
 Jimmy Bancks
 Les Dixon
 Ambrose Dyson
 Alexander George Gurney
 Percy Leason
 Lionel Lindsay
 Norman Lindsay
 Ruby Lindsay

 David Low
 Jack Lusby
 Phil May
 Benjamin Minns
 Larry Pickering
 Norm Rice
 Alfred Vincent
 Unk White

According to The Times of London, "It was The Bulletin that educated Australia up to Federation".

In his 1923 novel Kangaroo, English author D. H. Lawrence wrote of a character who reads The Bulletin and appreciates its straightforwardness and the "kick" in its writing: "It beat no solemn drums. It had no deadly earnestness. It was just stoical and spitefully humorous." In The Australian Language (1946), Sidney Baker wrote: "Perhaps never again will so much of the true nature of a country be caught up in the pages of a single journal". The Bulletin continued to support the creation of a distinctive Australian literature into the 20th century, most notably under the editorship of Samuel Prior (1915–1933), who created the first novel competition.

The publication was folio size and initially consisted of eight pages, increasing to 12 pages in July 1880, and had reached 48 pages by 1899. The first issue sold for four pence, later reduced to three pence, and then, in 1883, was increased to six pence.

A Woman's Letter
The Bulletin was seen to be lacking a "gossip column" such as that conducted by "Mrs Gullett" in The Daily Telegraph. W. H. Traill, part-owner of the Bulletin, was aware of the literary talents of his sister-in-law Pattie Lewis, who had been, as "Mab", writing children's stories for the Sydney Mail. He offered the 17-year-old a column to be called A Woman's Letter, which involved reporting on the comings and goings of notable Sydney socialites.
In time the column became quite popular, and reportedly the first item looked for in the magazine by both men and women.
When Lewis married, it was she who recommended her successor, Ina Wildman, the audacious "Sappho Smith".
Seven women wrote the "Woman's Letter" for The Bulletin:
1881–1888 Pattie Lewis (died 1955) as "Mab"; married James Fotheringhame in 1886
1888–1896 Ina Wildman (died 1896) as "Sappho Smith" 
1896–1898 Florence Blair (died 1937), daughter of David Blair, she married Archibald Boteler Baverstock in 1898.
1898–1901 Louise Mack (1870–1935) married John Percy Creed in 1896 and Allen I. Leyland in 1927.
1901–1911 Agnes Conor O'Brien (died 1934) as "Akenehi" or "Lynette". She married artist and newspaperman William Macleod in 1911 
1911–1919 Margaret Cox-Taylor (died July 1939) as "Vandorian" 
1919–1934 Nora Kelly as "Nora McAuliffe"

Later era
The literary character of The Bulletin continued until 1961, when it was bought by Australian Consolidated Press (ACP), merged with the Observer (another ACP publication), and shifted to a news magazine format. Donald Horne was appointed as chief editor and quickly removed "Australia for the White Man" from the banner. The magazine was costing ACP more than it made, but they accepted that price "for the prestige of publishing Australia's oldest magazine". Kerry Packer, in particular, had a personal liking for the magazine and was determined to keep it alive.

In 1974, as a result of its publication of a leaked Australian Security Intelligence Organisation paper discussing Deputy Prime Minister Jim Cairns, the Whitlam Government called the Royal Commission on Intelligence and Security.

In the 1980s and 1990s, The Bulletins "ageing subscribers were not being replaced and its newsstand visibility had dwindled". Trevor Kennedy convinced publisher Richard Walsh to return to the magazine. Walsh promoted Lyndall Crisp to be its first female editor, but James Packer then advocated that former 60 Minutes executive producer Gerald Stone be made editor-in-chief. Later, in December 2002, Kerry Packer anointed Garry Linnell as editor-in-chief.

Kerry Packer died in 2005, and in 2007 James Packer sold controlling interest in the Packer media assets (PBL Media) to the private equity firm CVC Asia Pacific. On 24 January 2008, ACP Magazines announced that it was shutting The Bulletin. Circulation had declined from its 1990s' levels of over 100,000 down to 57,000, which has been attributed in part to readers preferring the internet as their source for news and current affairs.

Editors
The Bulletin had many editors over its time in print, and these are listed below:

 J. F. Archibald
 John Haynes
 William Henry Traill
 James Edmond  
 Samuel Prior
 John E. Webb
 David Adams
 Donald Horne
 Peter Hastings
 Peter Coleman
 Trevor Kennedy
 James Hall
 Lyndall Crisp
 Gerald Stone
 Max Walsh
 David Dale
 Paul Bailey
 Garry Linnell
 Kathy Bail
 John Lehmann

S. H. Prior
Samuel Henry Prior (10 January 1869 – 6 June 1933) was an Australian journalist and editor, best known for his editorship and ownership of The Bulletin. Born in Brighton, South Australia, Prior was educated at Glenelg Grammar School and the Bendigo School of Mines and Industries. He started his career as a teacher, before becoming a mining reporter at the Bendigo Independent. In 1887, he was assigned to Broken Hill, New South Wales, to report on the silver mine. He was briefly editor at the Broken Hill Times and then at its successor, Broken Hill Argus. In 1889, Prior joined the Barrier Miner as editor, remaining in the role for 14 years, during which time he displayed nationalism and championed trade unionism and the Federation of Australia.

After sending some of his work to J. F. Archibald at the Sydney Bulletin, he was appointed finance editor in 1903. In this role, he increased importance of the "Wild Cat" column, a financial and investment news and insights column focused on mining companies, which eventually (by 1923) grew into Wild Cat Monthly. Prior was promoted to associate editor in 1912. In 1914, Archibald sold his shares in The Bulletin to Prior, making Prior the majority shareholder. In 1915, he became the senior editor, in which position he built The Bulletins reputation for literature and for financial journalism. In 1927, he was sold the remaining shares in The Bulletin and thus became not only its editor but its sole owner and manager. In 1928, he inaugurated the first Bulletin Novel Competition, offering aspiring writers prize money and the publishing of their work in The Bulletin.

Prior remained editor until 1933, when he died from heart disease. In 1935, his son established the S. H. Prior Memorial Prize for a work of Australian literature. Prior's family retained control of the magazine until it was bought by Consolidated Press Ltd in 1960.

Garry Linnell
Garry Linnell joined The Bulletin in 2001 and became editor-in-chief in 2002, when the magazine was already dropping in circulation and running at a loss. On one occasion, Kerry Packer called Linnell to his office, and, when Linnell asked what Packer wanted for The Bulletin, Packer said: "Son, just make 'em talk about it." When former Prime Minister Paul Keating sent Linnell a letter criticising the magazine and calling it "rivettingly mediocre", Linnell published the letter in the magazine, promoted that "Paul Keating Writes for Us", and awarded Keating with "Letter of the Week", with the prize for that being a year's subscription to the magazine. In 2005, Linnell offered a $1.25-million reward to anyone who found an extinct Tasmanian tiger.

Columnists and bloggers
Regular columnists and bloggers on the magazine's website included:

 Patrick Cook
 Paul Daley
 Julie-Anne Davies
 Roy Eccleston
 Ellen Fanning
 Katherine Fleming
 Chris Hammer
 Laurie Oakes
 Leo Schofield
 Adam Shand
 Terrey Shaw
 Rebecca Urban

See also
Bill Fitz Henry
The Bookfellow
The Bulletin Debate

References

Further reading

External links
  [CC-By-SA]
 

1880 establishments in Australia
2008 disestablishments in Australia
ACP magazine titles
Antisemitism in Australia
Defunct political magazines published in Australia
Magazines disestablished in 2008
Magazines established in 1880
Magazines published in Sydney
News magazines published in Australia
Weekly magazines published in Australia